The Mariavite Church is today one of two independent Christian churches collectively known as Mariavites who first emerged from the religious inspiration of Polish noblewoman and nun, Feliksa Kozłowska (1862-1921) in the late 19th-century. Initially, it was a renewal movement seeking reform in Polish Catholicism. The movement was an attempt to replicate the simplicity of the life of Mary, in Latin, ("Let them imitate the Life of Mary"), thus vita Mariae, the Life of Mary, gave the movement its name.

History 
After a growing conflict with Polish Catholic bishops, the movement was eventually reported to the Vatican as an attack on the ecclesiastical status quo and became the object of two Papal bulls that resulted in the wholesale excommunication of both clergy and lay adherents of the movement. In the face of excommunication from the Catholic Church, the leaders of the movement sought refuge with the Old Catholic Church of the Netherlands which, after negotiations was welcoming and granted both recognition and Apostolic succession, which gave it the power to confer holy orders. The "Mariavite Church" therefore became considered as a separate and independent religious denomination in Poland.

Throughout its early tribulations with the Rome authorities, it was led by Jan Maria Michał Kowalski until 1935, when he was "deposed" as bishop, and a schism occurred. The church split in two, mainly around the issues of married clergy, the ordination of women and Kowalski's personal stance on sexual behaviour. Henceforth the "Kowalski parishes" formed the Catholic Mariavite Church, and were relegated to the small estate of Felicjanów, named in honour of the foundress. The dissident majority became known as the Old Catholic Church of the Mariavites, which, after 1935, was led by bishop  and remained based in the city of Płock. To this day, by reason of the number of worshippers and parishes, they are the larger of the two churches. After 1935, the leadership of the smaller church grouping, the Catholic Mariavite Church, remained loyal to bishop Kowalski, and later to his widow, bishop Maria Izabela Wiłucka-Kowalska.

The Old Catholic Mariavite Church is a member of the Polish Ecumenical Council, and also of the World Council of Churches. It is not currently a member of the Old Catholic Union of Utrecht. Since 2015,  is the primate bishop of the Old Catholic Mariavite Church. By contrast, the Catholic Mariavite Church currently stands away from the ecumenical movement.

Name changes
The name of the church was Old Catholic Mariavite Church from 1910 to 1967, and  onward.

History

Polish Roman Catholic Church under Russian rule

From 1795 the territory of the Polish–Lithuanian Commonwealth had been partitioned between the three neighbouring powers, the Austrian Empire, the Kingdom of Prussia and the Russian Empire. Under the Russian Empire, where the Russian Orthodox Church was the established church, Polish Catholic religious organizations became illegal. The situation of the Catholic Church was worst in the Russian Partition.

After the 1863 January Uprising, the tsarist authorities forbade the establishment of any new Polish organisations. Religious orders were often banned or exiled. Catholic clergy in the Russian Partition could not be locally educated, in contrast to the priests in the Austrian and Prussian Partitions. The only authorized Roman Catholic theological training in the Russian Empire was at the Saint Petersburg Roman Catholic Theological Academy. Catholic priests were often criticized for their inappropriate personal behaviour and exploitation of the peasantry. The Mariavite movement emerged out of this complex situation.

Kozłowska's revelations 
In 1893 Kozłowska had her first religious vision. In it she understood she was to found a new religious movement expressing "Mariavitism". More visions followed until 1918. Their content was gathered in a volume entitled Dzieło Wielkiego Miłosierdzia (The Work of Great Mercy) in 1922.

Excommunication 
A final decision was made in September 1904.

In April 1906, Pius X promulgated the encyclical . In December 1906, the Catholic Church excommunicated Kozłowska, Kowalski.

Mariavite Church, 1906–1921

In 1914 the Mariavites finished their main church in Płock, the Sanctuary of Mercy and Charity.

Archbishop Kowalski (1921–1935)
The Mariavites' homepage summarizes Kowalski's reforms and innovations:
 1922–1924 - Marriage available for priests
 1922: Communion under the two species
 1929: the Ordination of women, introduced in the Catholic Mariavite Church (with possibility of marriage)
 1929–1935 Ordination of women, abolished in Old Catholic Mariavite Church (one reason for the schism in the church)
 1930: Priesthood of the people of God similar to Protestant concept
 1930: Eucharist for new-born baptized infants
 1930: Removal of ecclesiastical titles
 1930: Suppression of prerogatives of the clergy
 1931–1933: Simplification of liturgical ceremonies
 1931–1933: Simplification of the Lenten sacrifice
 ?: Reduction of the Eucharistic fast

Kowalski's innovations disrupted the connection with the Old Catholics.

The church struggled during the Second Polish Republic. Mariavites were discriminated against to the extent of "Mariavite pogroms". The leaders of the Mariavite Church were often sued in court. Kowalski appeared in 20 cases. He was accused of blasphemies.

After the 1935 schism
The Kowalski loyalists moved from Płock to Felicjanów. The village is the headquarters of the Catholic Church of the Mariavites, which has about 3,000 members. The denomination confirmed all the decisions of Kowalski and introduced a public cult of Kozłowska, the Mateczka, the Spouse of Christ and new Redemptrix of the world. The church is insular and does not participate in the ecumenical movement. Kowalski died in Dachau concentration camp during World War II. His successor was his wife, Bishop Maria Izabela Wiłucka-Kowalska. From 1946 to 2005, the head of the church was Bishop . He was succeeded in 2005 by Bishop .

Feldman led the opposition to Kowalski and attracted the majority of Mariavite adherents. They decided to reverse most of the innovations introduced by Kowalski. They returned to Kozłowska's ideas and rules. The Old Catholic Mariavite Church is much the larger:  it had about 23,500 members in Poland.

Structure of the Mariavite churches

Old Catholic Mariavite Church

Leaders:
 1906–1935: Jan Maria Michał Kowalski
 1935–1945: Maria Filip Feldman
 1945–1953: 
 1953–1955: 
 1955–1965: 
 1965–1972: 
 1972–1997: 
 1997–2007: 
 2007–2015: 
 2015–present: 

Administration:

organized into three dioceses in Poland with 38 parishes and one province in France with 2 parishes:
 with cathedral in Płock
 with cathedral in Cegłów
 with cathedral in Łódź
 with cathedral in Paris

Order of the Mariavites in Germany
The Order of the Mariavites in Germany is an  type association in Germany. Even in 1949, this association was not legally recognized as a sect by Germany. This association is not recognized by either the contemporary Old Catholic Mariavite Church or the Catholic Mariavite Church.

Apostolic succession:
Kowalski consecrated  on 4 September 1938 in Felicjanow, Poland
Fatôme consecrated  on 9 October 1949 in Mannheim, Germany
Maas consecrated  on 31 October 1987 in Cologne, Germany

Apostolic succession
Kowalski was consecrated in St. Gertrude's Cathedral, Utrecht, on 5 October 1909, by Old Catholic Church of the Netherlands (OKKN) Archbishop Gerardus Gul of Utrecht, assisted by two OKKN bishops, J. J. van Thiel of Haarlem and N. B. P. Spit of Deventer, one Catholic Diocese of the Old Catholics in Germany bishop, J. Demmel of Bonn, and Arnold Harris Mathew of London.

Kowalski consecrated: Fatome, Feldman, Gołębiowski, Próchniewiski, Rostoworowski, Siedlecki, and his own wife, Maria Izabela Wiłucka-Kowalska.

Notes

References

Sources

Further reading

External links

 

 
Christian organizations established in 1903
Christian denominations established in the 20th century
1903 establishments in Poland